Arnaldo Villalba Benítez (born 21 October 1978) is a Paraguayan former professional footballer who played as a forward.

References

External links
 
 

1978 births
Living people
Paraguayan footballers
Association football forwards
Sportspeople from Ciudad del Este
Club Olimpia footballers
Club Sol de América footballers
Tupi Football Club players
Rampla Juniors players
Cerro Porteño players
Club Atlético 3 de Febrero players
Alianza Atlético footballers
Persijap Jepara players
Cobresol FBC footballers
PS Barito Putera players
Persis Solo players
Paraguayan expatriate footballers
Paraguayan expatriate sportspeople in Brazil
Expatriate footballers in Brazil
Paraguayan expatriate sportspeople in Indonesia
Expatriate footballers in Indonesia
Paraguayan expatriate sportspeople in Uruguay
Expatriate footballers in Uruguay
Paraguayan expatriate sportspeople in Peru
Expatriate footballers in Peru